Growing Up in the Universe was a series of lectures given by Richard Dawkins as part of the Royal Institution Christmas Lectures, in which he discussed the evolution of life in the universe.

The lectures were first broadcast in 1991, in the form of five one-hour episodes, on the BBC in the United Kingdom. The Richard Dawkins Foundation for Reason and Science was granted the rights to the televised lectures, and a DVD version was released by the foundation on 20 April 2007.

Dawkins' book Climbing Mount Improbable developed from the ideas presented in the lectures, and the title itself is taken from the third lecture in the series.

Parts

Part 1: Waking Up in the Universe
To start off part one, Dawkins discusses the amazing capabilities of the human body and contrasts these with the limited capabilities of computers and other man-made machines. He uses a small totem pole (which is used in ancestor worship) to illustrate the importance of studying our ancestors to understand how we've evolved. To contrast ease of reproduction with the difficulty of becoming an ancestor, Dawkins uses the example of paper folding to explain exponential growth. Dawkins then tells the audience that exponential growth does not generally happen in the real world – natural factors come into play which control the population numbers, meaning that only an elite group of organisms will actually become distant ancestors. To be in this elite group, the organism must "have what it takes" to survive and pass on their genes to offspring.

The long chain of successful ancestors means that the probability of our existence is very small, and we are lucky to be alive. By turning down the lights and shining a small spotlight on a large ruler in front of him, Dawkins illustrates the darkness of the distant past and of the unknown future.

After expounding on how lucky we are to be alive, and urging us not to waste the precious time that we have, Dawkins brings up the usefulness of science in aiding our understanding of the universe. He mentions the reply that Michael Faraday gave to Sir Robert Peel when asked about the use of science. Faraday's response was "What is the use of a baby?" Dawkins explains that Faraday was either referring to the vast potential of a baby, or to the idea that there must be something more to life than growing up, working, getting old, and dying. There must be a point to it all; Perhaps science can uncover the answers to our biggest questions.

To shake off the "anesthetic of familiarity," Dawkins shows the audience a number of strange terrestrial organisms which he humorously nicknames "By-Jovians," playing off a term we might use to refer to living organisms from another planet, for instance Jupiter. He uses a scanning electron microscope to look at small organisms including mites, mosquitoes, and a bee being parasitized by a strepsiptera. Using a model of a eukaryotic cell, he discusses the mitochondria and presents the audience with a complicated diagram of the metabolic pathways.

Dawkins suggests that we can also shake off the familiarity by stepping backwards in time. By using a single pace to represent going back 1000 years, he starts at year zero and takes four steps in front of his desk, going back to 4000 BCE. Pointing to a portrait of Homo habilis, he states that to go back to the time of habilis, he would have to walk about two kilometers. He has audience members hold up portraits of other human ancestors, telling them how far he would have to walk to get back to the time of each one.

By imagining what an advanced alien species would think of humans if they were to arrive on Earth, Dawkins suggests that their science would be similar to ours. They would know about pi, the Pythagorean theorem, and the theory of relativity. However, Dawkins explains that the alien anthropologists would most likely scoff at our local, parochial religious beliefs. He then contrasts evidence-based beliefs with revealed, tradition-based, and authority-based beliefs.

To explain the problem with beliefs in the supernatural, Dawkins conducts a small experiment with the audience to "find the psychic." Using a coin, he assigns half the audience to will it to land on heads, and assigns the other half to will it to land on tails. After each flip, the section of the audience that was wrong is eliminated from the experiment, and he repeats the experiment using the remainder. After eight coin flips, only one boy in the audience remains. Dawkins then asks the question "Is he psychic?" Obviously, because of how the experiment was set up, one person was bound to have been correct about the result of each coin flip. Dawkins argues that this is exactly how seemingly supernatural events occur in the real world, especially when the "audience" is the entire population of the planet.

To conclude the lecture, Dawkins claims that there is nothing wrong with having faith in a proper scientific prediction. To illustrate this, he takes a cannonball which has been suspended from the ceiling with a rope, pulls it aside and touches it to his forehead. He announces that he is going to release the cannonball, letting it swing away from him, and that when it comes back to him, he is going to ignore his natural instinct to run because he has faith in his scientific prediction of what will happen – the cannonball should stop about an inch short of his forehead. He releases the cannonball, and his prediction is proved correct.

Part 2: Designed and Designoid Objects
Dawkins' second lecture of the series examines the problem of design. He presents the audience with a number of simple objects, such as rocks and crystals, and notes that these objects have been formed by simple laws of physics and are therefore not designed. He then examines some designed objects – including a microscope, an electronic calculator, a pocket watch, and a clay pot – and notes that none of these objects could have possibly come about by sheer luck. Dawkins then discusses what he calls "designoid objects", which are complex objects that are neither simple, nor designed. Not only are they complex on the outside, they are also complex on the inside – perhaps billions of times more complex than a designed object such as a microscope.

Dawkins then shows the audience a number of designed and designoid objects, including the pitcher plant, megalithic mounds built by the compass termite, and pots made by trapdoor spiders, potter wasps, and mason bees. He examines some designoid objects that use camouflage, such as a grasshopper that looks like a stone, a sea horse that looks like sea weed, a leaf insect, a green snake, a stick insect, and a collection of butterflies that look like dead leaves when their wings are closed. Dawkins notes that many animals share similar types of camouflage or protection because of a process called convergent evolution. Examples of such designoid objects include the hedgehog and the spiny anteater (both of which evolved pointed spines along their back) and the marsupial wolf (which looks like a dog but is actually a marsupial). He illustrates the reason why convergent evolution occurs by using two small models of commercial aircraft. The reason they look similar isn't due to industrial espionage, it is due to the fact that they are both built to fly, so they must make use of similar design principles.

Using a camera and a model eye, Dawkins then compares the designed camera with the designoid eye. Both are involved in similar processes – using a lens to direct light onto a film or a retina. Both the camera and the eye also have an iris, which is used to control the amount of light which is allowed in. Using a volunteer from the audience, Dawkins demonstrates the contraction of the human iris by shining a light into her right eye.

The lecture then moves into an explanation of natural selection, which brings forth designoid objects. To explain natural selection, Dawkins first explains artificial selection by discussing the evolution of wild cabbage into broccoli, cauliflower, cabbage, red cabbage, kohlrabi, and Brussels sprouts. He continues the discussion of artificial selection by explaining the evolution of the ancestral wolf into the many varieties of modern dog. Starting with the ancestral wolf, Dawkins imagines that everyone on one side of the room is breeding for small wolves, while everyone on the other side is breeding for big wolves. By selectively breeding the smallest or largest of each litter for a number of years, you may eventually end up with something like the Chihuahua on one side of the room, and something like a Great Dane on the other side of the room.

Dawkins then introduces an Arthromorphs computer program (similar to the Biomorphs program), explaining how it works while a volunteer uses the computer to selectively breed more and more generations.

At this point, Dawkins switches from explaining artificial selection to explaining natural selection. To demonstrate natural selection in a computer program, Dawkins uses a program written by Peter Fuchs to simulate the evolution of the spiderweb. The program builds "genetic" variations of a parent web, as if the web was actually being built by a child spider. For each generation, a simulation is run which randomly generates flies – some of which will hit the web, and others that will miss it. The child web that is able to capture the highest number of flies is selected as the parent for the next generation of webs. Dawkins shows the audience the "fossil record" that the program recorded after simulating a large number of generations overnight. The web starts off very simple and inefficient, but by the end it has evolved into a web that is highly efficient and highly complex. This is the same process that has led to the existence of all designoid objects.

Dawkins now discusses the most popular alternative to natural selection, which is known as creationism. He explains that creationists mistakenly believe designoid objects to be designed objects created by a divine being. Quoting from William Paley's Natural Theology, Dawkins discusses the argument from design using the example of the watch and the watchmaker. Even though designoid objects appear to be designed, Darwin proved that this is not the case. Although Darwin's theory was discovered well after Paley developed his watchmaker argument, Dawkins explains that the argument of a divine watchmaker was still a bad argument, even in Paley's day. Paraphrasing David Hume, Dawkins explains that anything capable of creating humans must itself be highly complicated. Thus, the argument from design actually explains nothing – "shooting itself in the foot." While it is true that designoid objects cannot come about by chance, evolution provides a non-random method of creation – namely, natural selection.

After developing the argument against a divine creator, Dawkins examines a number of designoid objects that contain imperfections, which is something you would not expect to find in an object that is supposedly created by a divine being. Showing the audience a halibut flatfish, he explains how they evolved from an upright swimming ancestor with one eye on each side of the head into a bottom-hugging flatfish with a distorted set of eyes on one side of the body. Dawkins claims that this is poorly designed, as any proper engineer would design an organism more like a skate, which flattened out on its belly instead of on its side. This is an example of something you would expect from an evolved/designoid object, but not something you would expect from a created/designed object.

Using labeled building blocks, Dawkins shows the audience how designed objects came to be. He starts off by placing the simple block on the bottom, and explaining that you don't have to start with a complex being, but can start with a very simple foundation. If you have a simple foundation, you can place the next block on top – the designoid block. From this block, you can get complex organisms. Only after complex designoid objects come to be can you get the final building block of design (microscopes, clay pots, etc.).

Part 3: Climbing Mount Improbable

Dawkins starts the lecture coming in with a stick insect on his hand. He describes with how many details such a being imitates its environment, its almost like a key that fits a lock. He then shows another insect, namely a Leaf Insect, which basically looks exactly like a dead leaf. He gives some more examples for this amazing imitation of the surrounding, e.g. a Potoo, which looks like a branch of tree and a thorn bug, which gains protection by looking like a rose thorn.

He, once again, makes the point that you can compare these beings with a key, which they represent themselves, whereas nature is the lock. Professor Richard Dawkins then explains that a key has to fit a lock exactly, and demonstrates this with a model of a lock. He mentions that a key is something very improbable. However it is hard to measure the probability of such a key, therefore Dawkins takes a bicycle lock for illustration, where you can calculate how likely it is to open the lock, because there is a fixed number of dials with a fixed number of positions. In Dawkin's case we have 3 dials, with 6 positions each, so the probability that you open the lock by sheer luck is one in 216.

Dawkins then shows the mechanism of the lock with a big model: Each dial has to be in the correct position in order to open up the lock. The model is then adapted to demonstrate a staged or gradualist solution to finding the right combination to open the lock. The probability of unlocking the combination in three separate phases falls to one in eighteen.

In this illustration, Dawkins identifies the role of sub-stages in Darwinian evolution. It is to increase the efficiency of mutation without affecting the probability of evolutionary success. The single stage requires 216, while the series of sub-stages requires only 18 non-random mutations at 100% probability of evolutionary success. That is an efficiency factor of 12 for mutations due to sub-staging without any change in probability. Similar efficiencies are achieved with random mutation without any change in probability.

After addressing the claim by Fred Hoyle that probability alone could not produce the complexity of a typed text by Shakespeare, Dawkins introduces the notion of inherited improvements over a number of generations. Nature proceeds through small evolutionary steps, rather than large leaps. This idea is illustrated by a model of the ascent of Mount Improbable, which provides the title for this lecture.

Dawkins then illustrates the difference between the reproduction of inanimate phenomena, such as fires spread through sparks, with the inter-generational transmission of DNA in living structures. The gradual evolutionary adaption of these organisms is demonstrated through the examples of the eye, varieties of wings and protective camouflage.

The example of the gradual emergence of the eye is first shown: starting with a simple light sensitive flat surface and demonstrating the evolutionary benefits of a cone shaped proto-eye for detecting shadows and shapes. Dawkins then relates this model to the simple pinhole eye structure of a nautilus mollusc.

The benefit of wing structures is illustrated by way of body flattening behaviour in tree snakes, the web like skin of flying squirrels and similar adaptions to be found on flying lizards.

Part 4: The Ultraviolet Garden

Dawkins begins by relating the story of asking a little girl "what she thought flowers were 'for'." Her response is anthropocentric, that flowers are there for our benefit. Dawkins points out that many people throughout history have thought that the natural world existed for our benefit, with examples from Genesis and other literature. Author Douglas Adams, who is sitting in the audience, is called to read a relevant passage from his novel The Restaurant at the End of the Universe.

Dawkins then asks his audience to put off the idea that the natural world exists for our benefit. He considers the question of flowers seen through the eyes of bees and other pollinators, and performs a series of demonstrations which use ultraviolet light to excite fluorescence in various substances.

Part 5: The Genesis of Purpose

Dawkins opens by talking how organisms "grow up" to understand the universe around them, which requires certain apparatus, such as a brain. But before brains can become large enough to model the universe they must develop from intermediate forms. Dawkins then discusses the digger wasp and the set of experiments conducted by Nikolaas Tinbergen of how the digger wasp models the local geography around its nest. He then talks about the limitations of the digger wasps' brain and concludes that only the human brain is sufficiently developed to model large-scale phenomena about the world. He then shows an MRI scan of a human brain (later revealed to be his own brain) and describes how an image develops from the eye onto the visual cortex.

Dawkins discusses how the image on the retina is upside-down and in two dimensions but the overlapping images from each of the eyes are composited to form a three-dimensional model in the brain. He shows this by asking the audience to focus on him while holding their hand at eye level which causes them to see two images of their hand; one from each eye. He then describes how using his finger to wriggle his eyeball that the outside world appears to move because he is moving the image on his retina. However this does not happen when he voluntary rolls his eyes from side to side. This is due to the brain using the internal model to compensate for the relative change in position of images on the retina. Dawkins gets someone to wear a virtual reality headset and move around in a 3-D computer generated world and draws an analogy between the model of the universe developed in one's head with the virtual reality universe developed in the computer.

He then goes on the show that the brain uses models to describe the universe by looking at how the brain interprets various optical illusions, such as the hollow-face illusion using a rotating hollow mask of Charlie Chaplin, the "impossible" geometry of a Penrose triangle, the shifting interpretations of the Necker cube and the ability of humans to find faces in random shapes.

Dawkins then begins to discuss the evolution of the human brain. He shows an animation of the increasing skull size from Australopithecus to Homo habilis to Homo erectus and then finally to modern day humans.

The ability of a brain to run complex simulations is a powerful evolutionary advantage. Dawkins talks about how this ability to model future events by showing a painting suggesting a hypothetical situation in which a female Homo erectus uses a mental model of a tree fallen across a gorge as a possible solution to crossing the gorge. The group then burns a tree so that it would create a bridge over the gap. He goes on to describe how the complex modelling ability of the brain may have developed due to this imaginative simulation of various possible scenarios or by the development of language, which would allow ideas to be passed from generation to generation, or by technology, which is an extension of human hands and eyes; or, indeed, if it is a combination of all three.

Dawkins concludes that purpose has arisen in the Universe due to human brains. The simulations developed in our brain allow us to develop intent and purpose; and over time our collective understanding of the Universe will improve as we continue to study and exchange ideas.

Quotations

Notes and references

External links
 Growing Up in the Universe - Richard Dawkins - YouTube 

BBC Television shows
BBC television documentaries
Biological evolution
Documentary films about science
Documentary films about nature
Documentary television shows about evolution
Richard Dawkins
1990s British documentary television series
Works about genetics